The Willows may refer to:

Places
 The Willows, El Paso, Texas, USA
 The Willows, Queensland, a town in Australia
 The Willows, Salford, home of Salford Rugby League club in Salford, England, UK
 The Willows, Saskatoon, a residential community in Canada
 The Willows, Pretoria, a suburb in the east of Pretoria, South Africa

Facilities and structures
Historic homes
 The Willows (Cavetown, Maryland), a historic farm complex on the U.S. National Register of Historic Places
 The Willows (Moorefield, West Virginia), a home on the U.S. National Register of Historic Places
 The Willows, the former mansion of Joseph Warren Revere in Fosterfields Farm, New Jersey

Entertainment
 "The Willows" (story), a 1907 short story by Algernon Blackwood
 The Willows (album), a 2004 album by Belbury Poly
 The Willows (group), a 1950s doo wop group.

See also

The Willowz, American rock band

Willow (disambiguation)